Les Tuniques Bleues (Dutch: De Blauwbloezen) is a Belgian series of bandes dessinées (comic books in the Franco-Belgian tradition), first published in Spirou magazine and later collected in albums by Dupuis. Created by artist Louis Salvérius and writer Raoul Cauvin, the series was taken up by artist Lambil after Salverius' death. It follows two United States cavalrymen through a series of battles and adventures. The first album of the series was published in 1970. The series' name, Les Tuniques Bleues, literally "the bluecoats", refers to the Northern (union) army during the American Civil War. Cinebook has started to print the comics in English as "The Bluecoats" releasing Robertsonville Prison in 2008. It is one of the best-selling series in French-language comics.

History
Cauvin has written the stories for the first 64 volumes.
Six of the first ten volumes were illustrated by Louis Salverius, with Lambil taking over after Salverius' death.

The first book,  (French for “A Wagon in the West”), was published in 1972. Their first album  (“The Special Correspondent”) is published out of sequence in 2020, as volume 65, while the final album by Cauvin and Lambil is released the following year as volume 64, titled  (“Where is Arabesque?”).

The stories appear first in Spirou, before being published as an album. The French editions are published by Dupuis. New albums are among the top ten best selling comics in French each year, with 184,800 copies for the 50th album alone in 2006.  spawned a 1989 computer game called North and South.

Plot

The original setting was the frontier of the Old West, where the main characters were American cavalrymen. Those stories, rarely longer than a single page, were comedic adventures about popular Western stereotypes and the absurdity of military life. One recurring feature was the blunder that led to the Cavalry fort being besieged by outraged Native Americans, or in one case, the cavalry having to besiege their own fort after the Indians have tricked them into leaving it and taken over. As the series progressed, the stories became longer and more involved, retaining their humorous highlights. The drawing style also changed, after the death of the original artist Salverius, from overtly cartoonish to semi-realistic.

In the second album, Du Nord au Sud, the main characters, Blutch and Chesterfield, travel east to join Ulysses S. Grant's army and fight in the American Civil War. The 18th album, Blue Retro, describes how the characters were first drafted into the military when the war had already begun and makes no mention of the time they spent on the frontier, contradicting the events in album 2 and others. This retconned origin and continuity hiccups are not detrimental to the enjoyment and understanding of the series since each album is a stand-alone adventure or collection of short stories. Adventures at the frontier fort still occasionally take place.

The two main protagonists are colorful and clashing opposites. Corporal Blutch is a reluctant soldier, highly critical of authority, whose only wish is to get out of the army and return to civilian life, often threatening to desert and coming up with ways to avoid going into yet another senseless battle. Blutch does have a heroic side and will not hesitate to fight against the Confederate troops even to the risk of his own life. Sergeant Cornelius Chesterfield is by contrast a devoted and obedient career soldier, always determined that he and Blutch should be in the thick of the action. He is proud of his scars and dreams of military glory. Though strong and brave to the point of recklessness, he is clumsy and narrow-minded, unable to clearly perceive the madness of the war around him. Though their relationship is often antagonistic, they are comrades for life and have saved each other's lives many times in spite of repeated threats made by both of doing the other in.

Other recurring characters include the somewhat insane, charge-obsessed Captain Stark and the bumbling general staff, headed by the anger-prone General Alexander. Historic figures are also occasionally present in the narrative: alongside General Grant, they include President Abraham Lincoln, Confederate commander Robert E. Lee, and war photographer Mathew Brady. As happens in fiction, especially in bandes dessinées, Blutch and Chesterfield often get sent on special missions which take them all over the map, from Mexico to Canada, and mix them up in projects from railroad construction to spying on the Confederacy's secret submarine project (based on the actual CSS David). Many albums are built around historical events or characters such as Chinese immigrant labor, the treatment of African American soldiers, Charleston's submarines, and General Lee's horse Traveller. Chesterfield even goes undercover to confront guerrilla leader William Quantrill and his henchmen Jesse and Frank James. On another occasion they had to contend with a racist officer, Captain Nepel, based on the French politician Jean-Marie Le Pen.

Historical details are generally quite exact, and accuracy has steadily improved over the years. Yet the series is first and foremost entertainment and historic details are altered to suit the story. The serious drama of the plots is balanced by frequent humorous incidents and Blutch's constant sarcastic wisecracks. Although this is not strictly speaking an adult-oriented bande dessinée, the authors are not afraid of showing the reality of war in a harsh, but tactful manner, such as dead bodies in the aftermath of a battle. Military authority, especially the uncaring and/or incompetent leader is often the subject of parody and derision.

Albums

 Un chariot dans l'Ouest
 Du Nord au Sud
 Et pour 1500 dollars en plus
 Outlaw
 Les déserteurs
 La prison de Robertsonville
 Les Bleus de la marine
 Les cavaliers du ciel
 La grande patrouille
 Des Bleus et des tuniques
 Des Bleus en Noir et Blanc
 Les Bleus tournent cosaques
 Les Bleus dans la gadoue
 Le blanc-bec
 Rumberley
 Bronco Benny
 El Padre
 Blue rétro
 Le David
 Black Face
 Les cinq salopards
 Des Bleus et des dentelles
 Les cousins d'en face
 Baby blue
 Des Bleus et des bosses
 L'or du Quebec
 Bull Run
 Les Bleus de la balle
 En avant l'amnésique!
 La Rose de Bantry
 Drummer boy
 Les Bleus en folie
 Grumbler et fils
 Vertes années
 Captain Nepel
 Quantrill
 Duel dans la manche
 Les planqués
 Puppet Blues
 Les hommes de paille
 Les Bleus en cavale
 Qui veut la peau du Général?
 Des Bleus et du Blues
 L'oreille de Lincoln
 Emeutes à New York
 Requiem pour un Bleu
 Les nancy hart
 Arabesque
 Marriage à fort Bow
 La traque
 Stark sous toutes les coutures
 Des bleus dans le brouillard
 Sang bleu chez les Bleus
 Miss Walker
 Indien, mon frère
 Dent pour dent
 Colorado Story
 Les bleues se mettes au vert
 Les quatre évangélistes
 Carte blanche pour un Bleu
 L'étrange soldat Franklin
 Sallie
 La bataille du Cratère
 Où est Arabesque ?
 L'envoyé spécial
 Irish Melody

Historical correlations 
Several albums highlight historical facts of the American Civil War, other adventures are set in a place or anonymous battle. Some accounts tell of an encounter with a Native American tribe without any relation to the American Civil War. However, the chronology of the albums does not follow that of the war, but several albums are in flashback, tracing the past of the two protagonists, possibly narrated by one of them (Bull Run) or another character (Vertes Années).

English translations
Cinebook Ltd has started publishing English translations from 2008, as "The Bluecoats". Fifteen books have been published to date.

Robertsonville Prison (French #6), 2008, 
The Navy Blues (French #7), 2009, 
The Skyriders (French #8), 2010, 
The Greenhorn (French #14), 2011, 
Rumberley (French #15), 2012, 
Bronco Benny (French #16), 2013, 
The Blues in the Mud (French #13), 2014, 
Auld Lang Blue (French #18), 2015, 
El Padre (French #17), 2016, 
The Blues in Black and White (French #11), 2017, 
Cossack Circus (French #12), 2018, 
The David (French #19), 2019, 
Something Borrowed, Something Blue 
The Dirty Five ISBN 978-1800440043
Bull Run ISBN 978-1800440616

Video games
Les Tuniques Bleues was made into a video game named North & South in 1989 by Infogrames. In 2012, this game was adapted by Anuman Interactive as a multiplayer game.

In popular culture

Les Tuniques Bleues are among the many Belgian comics characters to jokingly have a Brussels street named after them. The Rue des Comédiens/ Komediantenstraat has a commemorative plaque with the name Rue des Tuniques Bleues/ Blauwbloezenstraat placed under the actual street sign.

References

External links
 Les Tuniques Bleues
 English publisher of The Bluecoats – Cinebook Ltd
Official Dupuis site

Bandes dessinées
Belgian comic strips
Belgian comics characters
Comics characters introduced in 1968
1968 comics debuts
Dupuis titles
Fictional soldiers
Fictional American people
Comic strip duos
Comics set during the American Civil War
Military comics
Works set in the 1860s
Comics set in the 19th century
Comics adapted into video games
Cultural depictions of Abraham Lincoln
Cultural depictions of Ulysses S. Grant